Crocheron is a remote unincorporated community in Dorchester County, Maryland, United States, south of Bishops Head.

References

Unincorporated communities in Dorchester County, Maryland
Unincorporated communities in Maryland
Maryland populated places on the Chesapeake Bay